The 25th Moscow International Film Festival was held from 20 to 29 June 2003. The Golden St. George was awarded to the Italian-Spanish film The End of a Mystery directed by Miguel Hermoso.

Jury
 Sergei Bodrov (Russia – President of the Jury)
 Agnieszka Holland (Poland)
 Ken Russell (Great Britain)
 Moritz Bleibtreu (Germany)
 Babak Payami (Iran)
 Mika Kaurismäki (Finland)
 Olga Budina (Russia)

Films in competition
The following films were selected for the main competition:

Awards
 Golden St. George: The End of a Mystery by Miguel Hermoso
 Special Silver St. George: Roads to Koktebel by Alexey Popogrebsky, Boris Khlebnikov
 Silver St.George:
 Best Director: Jang Joon-hwan for Save the Green Planet!
 Best Actor: Faramarz Gharibian for Dancing in the Dust
 Best Actress: Shinobu Otake for Owl
 Special prize for an outstanding contribution to world cinema: Kaneto Shindo
 Stanislavsky Award: Fanny Ardant

References

External links
Moscow International Film Festival: 2003 at Internet Movie Database

2003
2003 film festivals
2003 festivals in Europe
Mos
2003 in Moscow
June 2003 events in Russia